Karl Müller, also Carl Müller ( 29 October 1818 – 15 August 1893) was a German late Nazarene painter of the Düsseldorf school of painting.

Life 
Born in Darmstadt, Müller was the son of the court painter and gallery director  (1784–1835). Like his older brothers Andreas and Constantin, he attended the Düsseldorf Art Academy after training with his father, where he was enrolled from 1835. After initial lessons with Karl Ferdinand Sohn, he was instructed there from 1836 by Friedrich Wilhelm von Schadow. He was listed as his  in 1849/1850.

In 1839 he undertook a trip to Italy with Franz Ittenbach, accompanied by Schadow, to study fresco painting of the Quattrocento. From 1840 to 1842 he lived in Rome, where he met, among others, Peter von Cornelius and Friedrich Overbeck. From there, he undertook study trips to Tuscany and Umbria. In spring 1843, he studied the monumental Cornelius frescoes in the Munich Ludwigskirche.

From 1844 to 1850, he worked together with Ernst Deger, Ittenbach and his brother Andreas on the painting of the Apollinariskirche in Remagen, a major work of late-Nazarene painting of the Düsseldorf School. From this time on, Müller prepared for the painting of the pilgrimage church Notre-Dame de la Garde in Marseille, a work that was planned for a painting period of ten years, but was not carried out due to financing problems and the Franco-Prussian War.

Together with Karl Woermann, Müller represented the Düsseldorf Academy in 1877 at the inauguration of the New Building of the Academy of Arts Vienna. From 1883 to 1893, Müller took over the direction of the Kunstakademie Düsseldorf from Hermann Wislicenus after disputes arose over the latter's person. Also until 1893, he was in charge of the academy's "Hall of Antiquities".

Müller died in Bad Neuenahr at the age of 74.

Work 

Müller mainly created religious paintings in the late Nazarene style. Many of his paintings became known through engravings and photographic reproductions. In addition, Müller was active as a portrait painter.

 Mädchenkopf, 1835
 Der auferstandene Christus in seiner Jünger Mitte,  watercolour, 1837
 Christus mit seinen Jüngern im Ährenfelde,  watercolour, 1837
 Tobias mit dem Engel, 1838
 Bildnis der Schwester Friederike, Erinnerungsbild um 1838
 Caritas, 1839
 Verkündigung, Sepiazeichnung nach Fra Angelico (Kloster San Marco, Florenz), Museum Kunstpalast
(for instance Die Hl. Familie bei der Arbeit, Die Hl. Familie auf der Rast, Immaculata conceptio, Mutter des Erlösers, Jungfrau Maria).
 together with Ernst Deger, Franz Ittenbach and Andreas Müller: Ausmalung der Apollinariskirche, Remagen, 1844–1853 (Fresken: Krönung Mariae, Geburt Mariae and Die vorbildlichen Frauen, Die Verkündigung, Apokalyptisches Lamm)
 Madonna mit dem Kinde, inmitten der Heiligen Heinrich und Hedwig, 1854 for the Prince Bishop Heinrich Förster
 Maria und Elisabeth, 1859 von Heinrich Förster erworben
 Bewachsene Burgruine, Aquarell über Bleistiftzeichnung, Darmstadt 1861
 Heilige Familie, Kreidezeichnung, 1872, Metropolitan Museum of Art, New York.
 Madonna vor der Grotte, 1876
 Josef mit dem Jesusknaben, Altarpiece for St. Remigius, Bonn, 1882
 Anna mit Maria, Altarpiece for St. Remigius, Bonn, 1882

References

Further reading 
 : Biographisches Künstler-Lexikon. Verlag des Bibliographischen Instituts, Leipzig 1882,  (Numerized).
 : Carl Müller. Sein Leben und künstlerisches Schaffen (Görres-Gesellschaft zur Pflege der Wissenschaft im Katholischen Deutschland, Vereinsschrift). Bachem, Cologne 1896.
 Eduard Daelen: Müller, Karl. In Allgemeine Deutsche Biographie (ADB). Vol. 52, Duncker & Humblot, Leipzig 1906, .
 Hans Vollmer: Müller, Karl. In Allgemeines Lexikon der Bildenden Künstler von der Antike bis zur Gegenwart. Created by Ulrich Thieme and Felix Becker. Vol. 25: Moehring–Olivié. E. A. Seemann, Leipzig 1931, .
 Dieter Graf: Die Düsseldorfer Spätnazarener in Remagen und Stolzenfels. In Wend von Kalnein (ed.): Die Düsseldorfer Malerschule. Verlag Philipp von Zabern, Main 1979, pp. 121 ff.

External links 

 Carl Müller. Kurzbiografie im Portal fichterart.de
 Müller, Carl. Photo in Portal bavarikon.de (Bayerische Staatsbibliothek)

19th-century German painters
19th-century German male artists
German history painters
German portrait painters
Nazarene painters
Academic staff of Kunstakademie Düsseldorf
1818 births
1893 deaths
Artists from Darmstadt
Düsseldorf school of painting